Allison Parks (born Gloria Waldron; October 18, 1941 – June 21, 2010) was an American model and actress. She was chosen as Playboy magazine's Playmate of the Month in October 1965, and Playmate of the Year for 1966, appearing as the cover model and in a pictorial in the May issue. She was also in a Playboy Mansion pictorial in the January 1966 issue of Playboy, along with Ashlyn Martin. Her original pictorial was photographed by William Figge.

Career
"Allison Parks" was a pseudonym she used when modelling for Playboy.  She told The Playmate Book that she liked it so much, she kept it as her professional name. She was a mother at the time of her centerfold, and her kids were featured in a photo in her layout, but they were identified as swimming school students.

After her Playmate work, Parks went on to a long career as a model and actress, mostly in TV commercials.

Death
Parks died of heart failure while on vacation in Hawaii, at the age of 68.

See also
 List of people in Playboy 1960–1969

References

External links
 
 
 

1941 births
2010 deaths
1960s Playboy Playmates
Playboy Playmates of the Year
American television actresses
Actresses from Glendale, California
Actresses from California
20th-century American actresses
21st-century American women